The 2018 Global T20 Canada (also known as Canada Dry Global T20 Canada for sponsorship reasons) of the Global T20 Canada, was a 20-over cricket cricket tournament played in Canada. It was the first edition of the tournament and ran from 28 June to 15 July 2018. Six teams took part, with all the matches played at the Maple Leaf Cricket Club in King City, Ontario.

A player draft took place on 3 June 2018. Approximately 1,600 players registered for the draft, with 600 of those from Canada. Ahead of the draft, the following ten international cricketers were named as marquee players: Shahid Afridi, Dwayne Bravo, Chris Gayle, Chris Lynn, Lasith Malinga, David Miller, Sunil Narine, Andre Russell, Darren Sammy and Steve Smith. Smith played in the opening match of the tournament and Warner played in the second match of the tournament, both played their first representative matches since being found guilty of ball-tampering during the third Test match between South Africa and Australia in March 2018.

In the final, Vancouver Knights defeated Cricket West Indies B Team by seven wickets to win the tournament.

Teams and squads
The following teams, squads and coaches were announced for the tournament:

Points table

The top four teams qualified for the playoffs
 Advanced to Playoff 1
 Advanced to Playoff 2

League stage
The full fixtures were confirmed on 13 June 2018. The first round took place from 28 June to 7 July, the second round took place from 8 to 11 July and  playoffs from 12 to 15 July 2018. Times shown were Eastern DST.

Round 1

Round 2

Playoffs

Bracket

Final

References

External links
 Series home at ESPN Cricinfo

2018 in Canadian cricket
Canadian domestic cricket competitions
June 2018 sports events in Canada
July 2018 sports events in Canada
Global T20 Canada seasons